Rod Campbell (born 4 May 1945) is a Scottish author and illustrator of several popular children's books including the classic lift-the-flap board book Dear Zoo.

Born in Scotland in 1945, he was brought up in Zimbabwe and returned to Britain where he completed a doctorate in organic chemistry. In 1980 he became involved in children's publishing where he began designing innovative books with interactive elements and repetitive phrases.

In 1987 he founded Campbell Blackie Books in partnership with his publisher Blackie. Campbell Books (as it became in 1989) was sold in 1995 to Macmillan Publishers.

Dear Zoo

Campbell's most famous work is Dear Zoo, first published in 1982. Campbell says that he was inspired by seeing other early lift-the-flap books, such as Spot the Dog, and wanted to incorporate the flaps into a story so that they made sense. He then thought of explorers sending animals to zoos years ago in crates, and hit upon the structure of each flap being a container holding a different animal.

Enormously popular among the under 5s in Britain, the book has been translated into Albanian, Arabic, Bengali, Chinese, Persian, French, Gujarati, Hindi, Panjabi, Portuguese, Russian, Simplified Chinese, Somali, Spanish, Turkish, Urdu, and Vietnamese, as well as being published in a number of formats and alongside various merchandise.

A spin-off Christmas title, Dear Santa, was first published in 2004 and follows the same format, with different gifts being considered by Santa hidden under flaps.

In 2017, the 35th anniversary of Dear Zoo was celebrated through a partnership with London Zoo and the publication of an Anniversary Edition in a slipcase format.

Notable works
Dear Zoo
Dear Santa
ABC Zoo
Oh Dear!
It's Mine!
I'm Hungry!
I Won't Bite!
Baby's Busy Book
My Presents
Noisy Farm
Farm 123
Farm Babies
Buster's Day
Buster's Zoo
Here's Buster, But Where's Teddy?
Buster Goes To Playschool
Buster Gets Dressed
Buster Keeps Warm
Buster's Bedtime
The Pop-Up Farm
The Pop-Up Jungle

References

External links
Official website
Interview on early years library network
Pan Macmillan website

1945 births
Living people
Scottish children's writers